The 1946 Idaho Southern Branch Bengals football team was an American football team that represented the University of Idaho, Southern Branch (later renamed Idaho State University) as an independent during the 1946 college football season. In their fourth season under head coach John Vesser, the team compiled a 4–3–1 record and were outscored by their opponents, 146 to 75.

End Harry Dickson was selected to the second team of the 1946 Little All-America college football team. The Bengals had most recently fielded a team in 1944, as no team was fielded during 1945 due to World War II. This was the first season that the team's stadium was formally named the Spud Bowl.

Schedule

Notes

References

External links
 1947 Wickiup football section — yearbook summary of the 1946 season

Idaho Southern Branch
Idaho State Bengals football seasons
Idaho Southern Branch Bengals football